is a Japanese actress who has been represented by the talent agencies Cent Force, then Staff-up, then Oscar Promotion, until finally becoming freelance in 2017.

Filmography

Television

TV series

Films

References

External links
Official Be Amie profile 
 

Japanese actresses
1980 births
Living people
People from Kumamoto Prefecture